Kid is the second collection of poems by Simon Armitage, published in 1992. The book won a Forward Prize for Poetry.

Author 

Simon Armitage is an English poet, playwright and novelist. He was appointed as Poet Laureate of the United Kingdom in 2019. He is professor of poetry at the University of Leeds and became Oxford Professor of Poetry when he was elected to the four-year part-time appointment from 2015 to 2019. He was born and raised in Marsden, West Yorkshire. At the start of his career, and at the time Kid was published, he was working as a probation officer.

Book

Publication history 

Kid, Armitage's second book of poetry, was his first to be published by Faber and Faber, in 1992.

Contents 

The 48 poems in the collection, structured as a single list, include:

 "Kid" – the title poem, this is spoken by Batman's companion Robin.
 "Brassneck" – the story of two thieves attempting to steal from a crowd at a football game.
 "At Sea"
 "Robinson's Resignation" – the story of a businessman.
 "Great Sporting Moments: The Treble" – an exploration of class conflict.

Reception 

The collection was described by the poet and novelist Ruth Padel as being "Very Yorkshire; very Simon Armitage". She wrote that the book "consolidated his name for technical virtuosity [and] black humour", the voice having "a self-deprecatingly cocky self-centredness." In her view, the first poem, "Brassneck", about a murderer, had "brilliant rhyme"; but she noted that some, especially poets, "found it less convincing than Zoom!."

The book won a Forward Prize for Poetry in the "best first collection" category in 1992, the first year in which the prizes were awarded.

References

Bibliography 

 

1992 poetry books
English poetry collections